Stránov is castle in Jizerní Vtelno in the Central Bohemian Region of the Czech Republic. The original Middle Ages castle was reconstructed by Joseph Schulz to the neo-Renaissance look it has today.

History
In place of the present castle originally stood wooden fortress, which is recalled in 1429 by lord Bohuněk of Stránov. In its place Jaroš of Sovojovice built from 1463 to 1468 solid Gothic castle, which was named Nový Stránov.

From 1545 to 1589 the castle was owned by the Berka of Dubá family. In 1589, Karel of Bieberstein, the Imperial Council and the highest mint master Kingdom of Bohemia, acquired the castle. Later the castle was getting new owner Michael Slavata from Chlum. During the role of family Bieberstein or Slavata castle was rebuilt in the Renaissance style.

Around 1642, the owner became Jan of Lisov (a member of the Brandenburg nobility, he was promoted to the nobility for bravery in the Battle of Nördlingen and later to imperial commandant in the Cheb. His descendants after three generations declared to be the Czech nationality and called themselves as the Lords of Lisov. After on the castle lived of Jan's son, Rudolf Adam of Lisov, with his wife Elizabeth Lidmila (great-granddaughter of the astronomer Tycho Brahe) and she spent many years of her life in the castle.

In 1746, the ruler of the castle become by marriage Jan Václav Příchovský of Příchovice. This knight from the leading aristocratic family left around the castle manny visible traces – Stránov was rebuilt in the Baroque style, the castle garden was added (which unfortunately disappeared), sandstone Baroque fountain was built in the castle courtyard and in 1767 Church of Saint Wenceslaus in front of the castle. From 1794, it was owned by free lord Jan Herites, and after his death Václav Vojtěch Herites, and until 1864 Knight Bedřich Neubauer.

Present romantic appearance was made during the neorenaissance reconstruction in the late 19th century, which was performed in 1890–1894 on project designed by Joseph Schulz builder J. Mráz on order of Lady Marie of Waldstein and Vartemberk.

The castle was in 1917 bought by the Škoda factories President and Senator in Parliament Josef Šimonek, which was for a contribution to the development of industry promoted to the baron status. His son František Šimonek and his family lived on Stránov until castle was nationalized in 1950. After the nationalization of the castle was used as a children's home (in front of the chateau was located Common Agricultural cooperation), which led to a corresponding all non-sensitive adjustments (toilets and washing facilities were built into the main corridors and state rooms, etc.).

Since 2003 is back in the hands of the Šimonek family. The castle was in 2004 for the first time in its history, opened to the public, together with partial reconstruction of the interiors and exteriors of the castle. In summer, the castle hosts many cultural events.

External links

Castles in the Central Bohemian Region
Castles in the Czech Republic
Renaissance Revival architecture in the Czech Republic
Museums in the Central Bohemian Region
Historic house museums in the Czech Republic